The 1934 International cricket season was from April 1934 to August 1934.

Season overview

June

Test Trial in England

Australia in England

July

England in Netherlands

August

MCC in Ireland

References

1934 in cricket